Tarqi-ye Sofla (also Romanized as Tarqī-ye Soflá; also known as Tarqī, Ţaroqī, and Tarqey) is a village in Hesar Rural District, Khabushan District, Faruj County, North Khorasan Province, Iran. At the 2006 census, its population was 170, in 43 families.

References 

Populated places in Faruj County